Peltularia is a lichenized genus of fungi within the Coccocarpiaceae family.

References

Peltigerales
Lichen genera
Peltigerales genera
Taxa named by Rolf Santesson